Henry Anderson (13 October 1803 – 18 September 1873) was an English cricketer who played first-class cricket for the Marylebone Cricket Club, A to K, Single and the Sir St Vincent Cotton's XI.   His highest score of 13 came when playing for the Marylebone Cricket Club in the match against Middlesex.

References

English cricketers
Marylebone Cricket Club cricketers
1803 births
1873 deaths
A to K v L to Z cricketers
Married v Single cricketers